Thymus mastichina is a species in the family Lamiaceae. It is endemic to the central Iberian Peninsula in Spain and Portugal.

References

mastichina
Herbs
Perennial plants
Flora of Portugal
Flora of Spain
Endemic flora of the Iberian Peninsula